Delbert D. Black (11 July 1922 – 5 March 2000) was a senior sailor in the United States Navy who served as the first Master Chief Petty Officer of the Navy from 13 January 1967 to 1 April 1971.

Early life and family
Black was born in Orr, Oklahoma, graduating from high school in 1940. He enlisted in the United States Navy on 14 March 1941.
Delbert "Del" Black was married to Irma Black for 50 years and had a son Donny D. Black. Grandfather to Dylan and Nathan Black.

Naval career
During his career, he advanced from striking for the rate of Gunner's Mate to the rank of Master Chief.

Master Chief Petty Officer of the Navy
On 13 January 1967, the Secretary of the Navy announced the appointment of Master Chief Gunner's Mate (GMCM) Black as the first Senior Enlisted Advisor, the position that would evolve into Master Chief Petty Officer of the Navy. As such, he was the highest rated enlisted man in the United States Navy, serving as the enlisted representative to the Chief of Naval Operations. His function was to counsel the highest ranks of the Navy on issues associated with enlisted guidance, leadership, and policy. Black was the first enlisted man to write a foreword for The Bluejacket's Manual.

Retirement and later work

Upon retirement from active duty, Black continued his involvement with the Navy through retired and active duty organizations. He was an active member of the USO Council of Central Florida; the Fleet Reserve Association; and Co-Chairman on the Secretary of Navy Committee on Retired Personnel. He died at his home in Winter Park, Florida from a heart attack at the age of 77. He is buried in Arlington National Cemetery, Section 11, Site 496 LH.

At a 13 March 2015 ceremony at the Navy Memorial in Washington, D.C., Navy Secretary Ray Mabus and Master Chief Petty Officer of the Navy (AW/NAC) Michael D. Stevens announced that an Arleigh Burke-class destroyer, USS Delbert D. Black, would honor Delbert Black.

Awards and decorations

 7 gold Service stripes.

References

External links
 Biography
 Biography at quarterdeck.org

1922 births
2000 deaths
People from Love County, Oklahoma
Master Chief Petty Officers of the United States Navy
United States Navy personnel of World War II
Burials at Arlington National Cemetery
Recipients of the Navy Distinguished Service Medal
People from Winter Park, Florida
United States Navy personnel of the Korean War
United States Navy personnel of the Vietnam War